Events in the year 1992 in Brazil.

Incumbents

Federal government
 President: Fernando Collor de Mello (until 29 December), Itamar Franco (starting 29 December)
 Vice President: Itamar Franco (until 29 December); vacant (starting 29 December)

Governors 
 Acre: Edmundo Pinto (until 17 May), vacant thereafter (starting 17 May)
 Alagoas: Geraldo Bulhões
 Amapa: Annibal Barcellos 
 Amazonas: Gilberto Mestrinho
 Bahia: Antônio Carlos Magalhães
 Ceará: Ciro Gomes
 Espírito Santo: Albuíno Cunha de Azeredo 
 Goiás: Iris Rezende
 Maranhão: Edison Lobão 
 Mato Grosso: Jaime Campos
 Mato Grosso do Sul: Pedro Pedrossian 
 Minas Gerais: Hélio Garcia 
 Pará: Jader Barbalho 
 Paraíba: Ronaldo Cunha Lima 
 Paraná: Roberto Requião de Mello e Silva 
 Pernambuco: Joaquim Francisco Cavalcanti  
 Piauí: Freitas Neto 
 Rio de Janeiro: Leonel Brizola
 Rio Grande do Norte: José Agripino Maia 
 Rio Grande do Sul: Alceu de Deus Collares
 Rondônia: Oswaldo Piana Filho
 Roraima: Ottomar de Sousa Pinto 
 Santa Catarina: Vilson Kleinübing 
 São Paulo: Luís Antônio Fleury Filho 
 Sergipe: João Alves Filho 
 Tocantins: Moisés Nogueira Avelino

Vice governors
 Acre: Romildo Magalhães da Silva (until 17 May), vacant thereafter (starting 17 May)
 Alagoas: Francisco Roberto Holanda de Melo
 Amapá: Ronaldo Pinheiro Borges 
 Amazonas: Francisco Garcia Rodrigues 
 Bahia: Paulo Souto 
 Ceará: Lúcio Gonçalo de Alcântara 
 Espírito Santo: Adelson Antônio Salvador 
 Goiás: Luís Alberto Maguito Vilela 
 Maranhão: José de Ribamar Fiquene 
 Mato Grosso: Osvaldo Roberto Sobrinho
 Mato Grosso do Sul: Ary Rigo 
 Minas Gerais: Arlindo Porto Neto 
 Pará: Carlos José Oliveira Santos 
 Paraíba: Cícero Lucena Filho 
 Paraná: Mario Pereira 
 Pernambuco: Carlos Roberto Guerra Fontes 
 Piauí: Guilherme Cavalcante de Melo 
 Rio de Janeiro: Nilo Batista
 Rio Grande do Norte: Vivaldo Costa 
 Rio Grande do Sul: João Gilberto Lucas Coelho 
 Rondônia: Assis Canuto 
 Roraima: Antônio Airton Oliveira Dias 
 Santa Catarina: Antônio Carlos Konder Reis 
 São Paulo: Aloysio Nunes 
 Sergipe: José Carlos Mesquita Teixeira 
 Tocantins: Paulo Sidnei Antunes

Events

May 
May 11 - Four stars, representing the states of Amapá, Roraima, Rondônia e Tocantins, founded in the last 10 years, are added to the flag of Brazil.

June 
June 3–14 - Earth Summit in Rio de Janeiro.
June 5 - Convention on Biological Diversity in Rio de Janeiro.

September 
September 29 - After a series of protests and accusations of corruption, president Fernando Collor de Mello is impeached and removed from congress and his powers are suspended. Itamar Franco becomes the acting president.

October 

October 2 
Carandiru massacre.

December 
December 29 - Brazil's president Fernando Collor de Mello is found guilty on charges that he stole more than $32 million from the government, preventing him from holding any elected office for eight years. Collor resigns the presidency hours sentence is passed by the Supreme Federal Court.

Date unknown 
 Quaternaglia Guitar Quartet is founded.
 The Professor Paulo Neves de Carvalho Government School is established.

Television
Você Decide debuts.
Felicidade ends.

Music

 The bands Charlie Brown Jr., Dazaranha, É o Tchan!, Os Travessos and Pato Fu are formed.

Sport

 1992 in Brazilian football 
 1992 Brazilian Grand Prix
 1992 Brazilian motorcycle Grand Prix
 1992 Maceió Open
 1992 Recopa Sudamericana
 1992 South American Cross Country Championships held in São Paulo.
 Brazil at the 1992 Summer Olympics
 Brazil at the 1992 Winter Olympics
 Associação Desportiva Guarujá, Atlético Clube Lagartense, Misto Esporte Clube, Osasco Futebol Clube Associação Desportiva Perilima, Serra Macaense Futebol Clube, Tubarão Futebol Clube and Veranópolis Esporte Clube Recreativo e Cultural are founded.

Births
 February 5 – Neymar, footballer
 February 23 – Casemiro,  footballer
 June 12 – Philippe Coutinho, footballer
 June 30 – Chay Suede, actor, singer. and 
composer
 August 13 – Lucas Moura, footballer
 August 20 – Carolina Horta, beach volleyball player
 August 21 – Felipe Nasr, racing driver
 October 2 – Alisson, footballer
 October 30 – MC Daleste, singer, songwriter and rapper (died 2013)

Deaths
December 12 - Togo Renan Soares, basketball coach (born 1906)

See also 
1992 in Brazilian football
1992 in Brazilian television

References

 
1990s in Brazil
Years of the 20th century in Brazil
Brazil
Brazil